Jayatar is a city in Sankhar within the Chapakot Municipality of the Syangja District of Gandaki Province in Nepal. According to the 2011 Nepal census, it had a population of 150.

References

External links 
Chapakot Municipality
District Coordination Committee Office, Syangja, Nepal

See also

Syangja District
Populated places in Syangja District